David, Davie or Dave Allan may refer to:

 David Allan (broadcaster) (born 1940), British television announcer and radio presenter
 David Allan (cricketer) (born 1937), West Indian cricketer
 David Allan (cyclist) (1951–1989), Australian cyclist
 David Allan (footballer) (1863–1930), Scottish international footballer
 David Allan (painter) (1744–1796), Scottish painter
 David Allan (police officer) (1879–1961), British police officer
 David W. Allan (born 1936), American atomic clock physicist
 Dave Allan (racing driver) (1965–2012), British auto racing driver
 Davie Allan, American rock guitarist, 1960s

See also
 David Allan Coe (born 1939), American country music singer
 David Allen (disambiguation)